Knockmoyle transmitting station is a transmission site located in the Slieve Mish mountains near Tralee, County Kerry. It is one of the busiest transmitting sites in County Kerry, and is home to numerous masts and services.

Transmissions

Digital television

Analogue radio

External links
Knockmoyle at ukfree.tv
Knockmoyle at MDS975

Buildings and structures in County Kerry